Valenciennes Football Club (commonly known as Valenciennes or USVA) is a French association football club based in Valenciennes. The club was founded in 1913 and currently play in Ligue 2, the second tier of French football. Valenciennes plays its home matches at the recently built Stade du Hainaut located within the city.

Valenciennes was founded under the name Union Sportive de Valenciennes Anzin (USVA). The club spent over 80 years playing under the name before switching to its current name. Valenciennes has spent an equal amount of time playing in Ligue 1 and Ligue 2 having played 40 seasons in the first division and 36 seasons in the second division. The club has never won the first division, but has won Ligue 2 on two occasions. Valenciennes has also won the Championnat National and the Championnat de France amateur in 2005 and 1998, respectively. In 1951, the club made its first and only appearance in a Coupe de France final.

From 2004 to 2011, Valenciennes was presided over by Francis Decourrière, a former politician who served as a Member of the European Parliament under the Social Democratic Party from 1994 to 1999 and later the Union pour la Démocratie Française (Union for French Democracy) from 1999 to 2004. In 2011, Decourrière left the position and was replaced by Jean-Raymond Legrand.

History 
Valenciennes Football Club was founded in 1913 by a group of young men known by surnames Colson, Joly, and Bouly. Due to the club having limited resources and its formation coinciding with the onset of World War I, Valenciennes sought a consolidation between locals clubs in the city. The merger was completed in 1916 with the club changing its name to Union Sportive de Valenciennes Anzin (USVA) in the process. Following the merger, the new club spent the ensuing 15 years playing the District de l'Escaut Championship. In July 1930, the National Council of the French Football Federation voted 128–20 in support of professionalism in French football. Valenciennes, under the leadership of president M. Le Mithouard, achieved professionalism in 1933 and were inserted into the second division. The club, subsequently, became a founding member of the second division of French football.

In the second division's inaugural season, Valenciennes finished in 7th place in its group. In the following season, the league table was converted into a single table and Valenciennes finished in 2nd-place position earning promotion to Division 1 as a result. During this period, the club was notably led by foreign players such as Englishmen Peter O'Dowd and George Gibson and the German-born attackers Édouard Waggi and Ignace Kowalczyk. In the club's first season in Division 1, Valenciennes finished 15th place falling back to Division 2. The club finished equal on points with Red Star Olympique, but due to having less wins and a lesser goal difference, Valenciennes were relegated. After suffering relegation, the club brought in a new president known by the surname of Turbot. Soon after arriving, Turbot released several of the club's international players and brought in the likes of Ernest Libérati to replace them. The transition was a success with the club earning promotion back to Division 1 in 1937. However, Valenciennes stint back in Division 1 was the equivalent of its first. The club finished in last place in the 1937–38 season and relegated back to Division 2. Due to World War II, Valenciennes reverted to amateur status and spent three of the six seasons in wartime playing amateur league football.

After the war, Valenciennes turned professional again and were back in the second division. The club spent a decade in Division 2 before earning promotion the top-flight ahead of the 1956–57 season. Under manager Charles Demeillez, in 1951, Valenciennes reached the final of the Coupe de France. In the final, the club faced Strasbourg and were humbled 3–0 at the Stade Olympique Yves-du-Manoir in the Colombes. In the club's return to Division 1, Valenciennes finished in the latter part of the table for three consecutive seasons. In 1959, Valenciennes reached the final of the Coupe Drago, but were defeated 3–2 in extra time by Lens at the Parc des Princes. In the 1959–60 season, Valenciennes achieved its best finish in Division 1 after finishing 8th in the table. However, manager Robert Domergue was unable to keep the consistency as Valenciennes finished 19th in the following season. Valenciennes, now being led by youngsters Bolec Kocik and Serge Masnaghetti, achieved promotion back to Division 1 after one season and spent the next nine years playing in Division 1. During the stint, Domergue led to club to its highest finish ever in the first division when the club finished 3rd in back-to-back seasons in 1965 and 1966. After the 1966 season, Domergue departed the club and he was replaced by Gaby Robert. Neither Robert or his successor Louis Provelli could match the consistency of Domergue and he returned to the club in 1970. In the club's first season back, Domergue led the club to relegation in 1971, got the club promoted back to the first division in 1972, and coached the club to relegation again in 1973. He departed after the season and was replaced by Jean-Pierre Destrumelle.

After spending the early 1970s hovering between top flight and the second division, Destrumelle led the club back to Division 1 for the 1975–76 season. The manager had vast majority of talent in the club, most notably Bruno Metsu, Bruno Zaremba, Dominique Dropsy, and Didier Six and kept the club in the first division for his entire campaign, however, after finishing in 18th place in 1979, Dustremelle was fired and replaced by the combination of Erwin Wilczek and Bolek Tomowski. Under the duo, Valenciennes lasted in Division 1 until the 1983 season. The club, subsequently, spent the next decade playing in Division 2 under five different managers, which led supporters to slowly become disassociated with the club.

From 1988 to 1991, Valenciennes improved significantly under manager Georges Peyroche. Peyroche left the club in 1991 and Francis Smerecki was named as his replacement. In Smerecki's first season, he led the club back to Division 1. In the club's first season back, Valenciennes were involved in a bribing scandal that effectively dismantled the club for the next decade. The scandal, which involved Marseille midfielder Jean-Jacques Eydelie and the club's general manager under the advisement of club chairman Bernard Tapie bribing Valenciennes players Christophe Robert, Jacques Glassmann, and Jorge Burruchaga, became headline news mainly due to Marseille being the most popular club in the country. It was asserted that the bribe was made in order for Valenciennes players to "take it easy" on Marseille players with the latter club having to play in the 1993 UEFA Champions League Final against Italian club Milan just days later. Marseille beat Valenciennes 1–0 and went on to defeat Milan to become the first French club to win the European competition. After the plot was discovered, Robert admitted to accepting the bribe, Burruchaga admitted to initially agreeing to it, but later changing his mind, while Glassmann said he never agreed to the deal. The subsequent reports of the scandal completely tarnished the Valenciennes's image and several players departed the club amid embarrassment and speculation that they were also involved in the plot. With the club now playing in Ligue 2, Valenciennes was unable to cope with the damage instilled on it due to the scandal and finished dead last in the league, thus falling to the third division for the first time in the club's lifetime. Two seasons later, the club was relegated to the fourth division due to financial problems. Ahead of the 1996–97 season, the club dropped to amateur status after filing for bankruptcy.

On 1 April 1996, the club was renamed Valenciennes Football Club and finished in fifth place in its inaugural campaign under the name. In the following season, the fourth division was renamed to the Championnat de France amateur and Valenciennes became inaugural champions of the league. Over the next seven seasons, Valenciennes played in the Championnat National, excluding one season back in the CFA. In the 2004–05 season, the club won National and returned to the second division, now called Ligue 2. Surprisingly, after one season, Valenciennes earned promotion back to the first division, now called Ligue 1, under the leadership of Antoine Kombouaré. After eight years in Ligue 1, the club was relegated to the second division in 2014. Because of this relegation, VAFC experienced financial problems and saw the return to the business of the former minister Jean-Louis Borloo. He saved the club from demotion to the fourth division.

Players

Current squad

Out on loan

Reserve squad

Notable players 
Below are the notable former players who have represented Valenciennes in league and international competition since the club's foundation in 1913.

For a complete list of Valenciennes players, see :Category:Valenciennes FC players.

 Noel King
 Nourredine Kourichi
 Jorge Burruchaga
 Wolfgang Matzky
 Ivica Osim
 Eugène Ekéké
 Roger Milla
 Joseph Yegba Maya
 Carlos Sanchez
 Arthur Masuaku
 Johan Audel
 Joseph Bonnel
 Jean-Claude Bras
 Bernard Chiarelli
 Renaud Cohade
 Dominique Corroyer
 Gaël Danic
 Léon Desmenez
 Jean-Claude Darcheville
 David Ducourtioux
 Laurent Dufresne
 Jacky Duguépéroux
 Dominique Dropsy
 Jean-Luc Fugaldi
 Jérôme Foulon
 Francis Gillot
 Jacques Glassmann
 Wilfried Gohel
 Jean-Pierre Guinot
 Bolec Kocik
 Hocine Lachaab
 Thierry Laurey
 Daniel Leclercq
 Joseph Magiera
 Serge Masnaghetti
 Rudy Mater
 Bruno Metsu
 Daniel Moreira
 Jean-Pierre Papin
 Nicolas Penneteau
 Jean-Claude Piumi
 Louis Provelli
 Grégory Pujol
 José Saez
 Steve Savidan
 Orlando Silvestri
 Didier Six
 Bruno Zaremba
 Pascal Zaremba
 Siaka Tiéné
 Éric Chelle
 Petrus Van Rhijn
 Włodzimierz Lubański
 Erwin Wilczek
 Milan Biševac
 David Régis

Management and staff

Club officials 
Valenciennes Football Club (SASP)
President: Eddy Zdziech
Association president: Jean-Claude Brienne
General director: Alain Dhee

Coaching and medical staff
Head coach: Nicolas Rabuel
Assistant coach: Rudy Mater

Youth coaching staff
Youth academy director: Gabriel Desmenez

Coaching history 

 Charles Griffiths (1933 - 1935)
 Peter Fabian (1935 - 1938)
 Charles Demeillez (1938)
 Pierre Parmentier (1938 - 1946)
 Arthur Plummer (1946 - 1947)
 Pierre Parmentier (1947 - 1948)
 André Tison (1948 - November 1950)
 Henri Pérus (November 1950 – 1953)
 Charles Demeillez (1951 – 1953)
 Robert Domergue (1953 – 1966)
 Gaby Robert (1966 – 1970)
 Louis Provelli (1970)
 Robert Domergue (1970 – 1972)
 Jean-Pierre Destrumelle (1972 – 1979)
 Wilczek and  Tempowski (1979 – 1982)
 Erwin Wilczek (1982)
 Léon Desmenez (1982 – 1986)
 Daniel Leclercq (1986 – 1987)
 Victor Zvunka (1987 – 1988)
 Georges Peyroche (1988 – 1991)
 Francis Smerecki (1991 – 1992)
 Boro Primorac (1992 – 1993)
 Bruno Metsu (1993 – 1994)
 Robert Dewilder (1994 – April 1996)
 Dominique Corroyer (April 1996 – June 1996)
 Ludovic Batelli (1996 – 2000)
 Didier Ollé-Nicolle (2000 – June 2003)
 Daniel Leclercq (June 2003 – July 2005)
 Antoine Kombouaré (July 2005 – June 2009)
 Philippe Montanier (June 2009 – June 2011)
 Daniel Sanchez (June 2011 – October 2013)
 Ariël Jacobs (October 2013 – July 2014)
 Bernard Casoni (July 2014 – February 2015)
 David Le Frapper (Feb. 2015 – Dec. 2015)
 Nicolas Rabuel (January 2016)
 Faruk Hadzibegic (Jan. 2016 – Sep. 2017)
 Nicolas Rabuel (Oct. 2017 – Nov. 2017)
 Réginald Ray (Nov. 2017 – June 2019)
 Olivier Guégan (June 2019 – Nov. 2021)
 Christophe Delmotte (Nov.2021 - )

Honours 
Ligue 2
Champions (2): 1972, 2006
Championnat National
Champions (1): 2005
Championnat de France amateur
Champions (1): 1998
Coupe de France
Runners-up (1): 1951
Coupe Charles Drago
Runners-up (1): 1959

References

External links 

Valenciennes FC at Flashscore

 
Football Club
Association football clubs established in 1913
1913 establishments in France
Football clubs in France
Football clubs in Hauts-de-France
Ligue 1 clubs